Sir John Alan Redwood (born 15 June 1951) is a British politician who has been the Member of Parliament (MP) for Wokingham in Berkshire since 1987. A member of the Conservative Party, he was Secretary of State for Wales in the Major government and was twice an unsuccessful candidate for the leadership of the Conservative Party in the 1990s. Redwood subsequently served in the Shadow Cabinets of William Hague and Michael Howard; he has remained a backbencher since then.

Redwood is a veteran Eurosceptic who was described in 1993 as a "pragmatic Thatcherite". He was the co-chairman of the Conservative Party's Policy Review Group on Economic Competitiveness until 2010. He has the role of Chief Global Strategist of investment management company Charles Stanley & Co Ltd (part of Charles Stanley Group). Redwood is a long-term critic of the European Union and of the United Kingdom's former membership of it. He supported Brexit in the 2016 EU referendum, and is a member of the British Eurosceptic pressure group Leave Means Leave.

Early life
John Redwood was born in Dover, the second child of William Redwood (1925–2016), an accountant and company secretary, and his wife, Amy Emma (née Champion), the manager of a shoe shop. He had an elder sister, Jennifer, who died as a baby in 1949. His childhood began in a council house, and describes his family buying their own house as a "big breakthrough" for the family.

Education
Redwood was educated at private Kent College, Canterbury, and Magdalen College, Oxford, where he graduated BA in modern history in 1971. He was a postgraduate at St Antony's College, Oxford, from 1971 to 1972 and was elected an Examination Fellow at All Souls College, Oxford, from 1972 to 1979, which later led to a distinguished fellowship in 2007. At All Souls, he wrote a DPhil thesis which investigated the fear of atheism in England, from the Restoration to the publication of Alciphron by George Berkeley. He graduated DPhil in 1975.

Political career
He was an Oxfordshire county councillor between 1973 and 1977, the youngest ever at the age of 21 when elected, and stood in the Peckham by-election of October 1982 where he lost to Harriet Harman. From 1983 onwards, he headed Margaret Thatcher's policy unit, where he was one of the champions of privatisation.

Redwood became MP for Wokingham in June 1987. Redwood was made a Parliamentary Under-Secretary of State in July 1989 for corporate affairs at the Department of Trade and Industry. In November 1990, he was promoted to Minister of State. Redwood became Minister for Local Government and Inner Cities following the 1992 general election, where he oversaw the abolition of the Community Charge, known colloquially as the "poll tax", and its replacement with the Council Tax.

Redwood was opposed to attempts to reduce the age of consent for homosexuality in both 1994 and 1999, choosing to vote to keep Section 28 in November 2003. He has generally been opposed to same-sex marriage. He voted for the reintroduction of capital punishment in 1988, 1990 and 1994 and voiced support for the reintroducing of the death penalty when he launched his leadership bid on 26 June 1995. Redwood has stated since then: "I have never spoken or written against civil partnerships and gay marriage and am not proposing any change to current laws. I regard the debate about capital punishment as being over and do not support its reintroduction."

In 2011, he abstained on the military intervention in Libya.

In government
In the government reshuffle of May 1993, Redwood was appointed to the cabinet as Secretary of State for Wales. He deferred some road-widening schemes in Wales because of suggested harm to the environment.

Redwood committed a gaffe in 1993, when he attempted to mime to the Welsh national anthem at the Welsh Conservative Party conference, when he did not know the words. Redwood subsequently learned the anthem but, in August 2007, an unconnected news story on Redwood was illustrated with the same clip. This resulted in Conservative activists filing complaints, and as a result the BBC apologised to Redwood for airing the dated footage.

In February 1995, he was at loggerheads with the Countryside Council for Wales, because he had decided to cut its grant by 16%. He also launched a scheme to provide more funding for popular schools with high numbers of applicants and concentrated extra expenditure on health and education services, away from administrative overheads.

Redwood consequently gained a somewhat haughty reputation with apparent disregard for national feeling; this did not endear him further to some of the population, including when he returned £100 million of Wales's block grant to the Treasury unspent in 1995.

Leadership contests and subsequent career
When John Major called upon his critics to "put up or shut up" and tendered his resignation to allow for a leadership challenge, Redwood resigned from the Cabinet, and stood against Major in the subsequent party leadership election on 26 June 1995. In the ballot held on 4 July 1995, Redwood received 89 votes, around a quarter of the then Parliamentary Party. Major received 218 votes, or two thirds of the parliamentary party vote. The newspaper The Sun had declared its support for Redwood in the run up to the leadership contest, running the front-page headline "Redwood versus Deadwood".

When Major resigned as party leader following the General Election defeat of May 1997, Redwood stood in the resulting election for the leadership, and was again defeated. After being defeated in the third round with 38 votes to Kenneth Clarke's 64 and William Hague's 62, Redwood backed Clarke against Hague.

Redwood was subsequently appointed Shadow Secretary of State for Trade and Industry by the victorious William Hague. He was appointed Shadow Secretary of State for the Environment, Transport and the Regions in June 1999, but was dropped in a mini reshuffle in February 2000, being succeeded by Archie Norman.

Under Michael Howard, he was appointed Shadow Secretary of State for Deregulation.

Brexit
Redwood is a veteran Eurosceptic. A critic of the Euro before its launch, in 2011 Redwood suggested that the Eurozone should "break up", and proposed that the United Kingdom should give up its Council voting rights in return for the ability to opt out of any EU legislation. There are no existing laws that would permit such an arrangement, as it would make European law not apply evenly across the Union as a whole. Later that year, he joined 81 rebel Conservative MPs in voting for an in-out referendum for leaving the European Union, saying afterwards "People used to call me an extreme Eurosceptic. Now I’m a moderate." Before the Brexit referendum, Redwood wrote that, to Conservative Eurosceptics like him, leaving the EU was "more important than which party wins the next election or who is the prime minister."

Since then, he has suggested the United Kingdom need not prioritise a post-Brexit deal with the EU, and received criticism for writing an investment advice column which recommended investors "look further afield" than the United Kingdom. Redwood denied this interpretation, saying that he simply advises investors of where international markets are heading and did not write an investment column "recommending investors pull their money out of the United Kingdom".

In statements to media and in the House of Commons, Redwood has consistently defended the position that the UK should not pay the so-called Brexit bill (amounting to around £39 billion). This is in line with a House of Lords EU financial affairs committee report, which itself is contested on its legal soundness since the financial settlement simply reflects commitments already entered into by the UK under the EU's multi-annual financial framework for the years 2014–2020 and therefore is not linked to the process of the UK leaving the European Union. In December 2019, Redwood voted in favour of the Withdrawal Agreement through which the UK accepts to pay its outstanding financial obligations to the EU.

In June 2021, Redwood criticised the composition of the G7 which includes the president of the European Commission and the president of the European Council in addition to representatives from France, Germany and Italy. According to Redwood this hands a majority to the EU in the G7, even if the G7 does not take decisions through majority voting.

Public image
He has often been compared to a Vulcan, a comparison originally made by Matthew Parris, due to his physical appearance and intonation, a preference for making arguments with logic over passion and a perception for being cold and humourless. Redwood said that he does not like the description but "if you don't like the heat then get out of the kitchen". He continued, "I think people sometimes go for those kind of things because they haven't managed to trap me in the more normal way".

Redwood supports the establishment of a devolved English parliament. Following the 2014 Scottish independence referendum, Redwood called for radical reform involving the establishment of an English Parliament. His politicking prior to and succeeding the referendum placed him "front and centre" to any political gain due to the perceived power vacuum resulting from any possible changes to the status quo of the union.

Honours
  Appointed to the Privy Council of the United Kingdom in 1993, giving him the honorific "the Right Honourable" for life.
  Knighted in the 2019 New Year Honours List.

Business career
Redwood worked as an investment analyst, manager and director for Robert Fleming and for NM Rothschild in the 1970s and 1980s. In 2007 he co-founded Evercore Pan-Asset Capital Management Ltd, a financial management company, which was subsequently sold to Charles Stanley. He is currently Chief Global Strategist at Charles Stanley & Co Ltd. He was previously a non-executive chairman of Mabey Securities, an investment arm of the engineering firm Mabey.

In January 2023, Sky News revealed that Redwood had, since the 2019 general election, earnt more than £600,000 in addition to his salary as an MP – the fifth-highest amount of any MP.

Personal life
He married Gail Felicity Chippington, a barrister, on 20 April 1974 in Chipping Norton; they had two children, Catherine (born 1978) and Richard (born 1982). The marriage broke down after 28 years, and they divorced a year later in July 2003.

In the media
Redwood was interviewed about the rise of Thatcherism for the BBC television documentary series of 2006, Tory! Tory! Tory!, and has often appeared on television, including appearances on the BBC's Question Time.

Redwood publicly argued with Greta Thunberg over the Climate emissions of the UK on Twitter.

Blog 
Redwood regularly updates a blog of political commentary which he has called John Redwood's Diary. Printed and bound copies of this blog are housed at the British Library and can be accessed through the British Library catalogue.

Bibliography 
 
 
 
 
 
 
 
 Reason, Ridicule and Religion: The Age of Enlightenment in England 1660–1750. Thames and Hudson. 1976.

References

External links
 John Redwood MP official site
 Debrett's People of Today
John Redwood MP, at UK Parliament Website
 Profile at the Conservative Party

 Profile: John Redwood, BBC News, 16 October 2002
 BBC Interview 2004
 

|-

|-

|-

|-

1951 births
20th-century British male writers
20th-century British non-fiction writers
21st-century British male writers
21st-century British non-fiction writers
Academics of Middlesex University
Alumni of Magdalen College, Oxford
British bloggers
British male bloggers
British Secretaries of State
Conservative Party (UK) councillors
Conservative Party (UK) MPs for English constituencies
Fellows of All Souls College, Oxford
Knights Bachelor
Living people
Members of Oxfordshire County Council
Members of the Privy Council of the United Kingdom
N M Rothschild & Sons people
People educated at Kent College
People from Canterbury
People from Dover, Kent
Politicians awarded knighthoods
Secretaries of State for Wales
The Times people
UK MPs 1987–1992
UK MPs 1992–1997
UK MPs 1997–2001
UK MPs 2001–2005
UK MPs 2005–2010
UK MPs 2010–2015
UK MPs 2015–2017
UK MPs 2017–2019
UK MPs 2019–present
British Eurosceptics